Burksville may refer to:

Burksville, Illinois
Burksville, Missouri